Nyco or NYCO may refer to:

Nyco Lilliu (born 1987) French singer
NYCO Imerys, American major producer of wollastonite 
NYCO SA, French manufacturer of synthetic lubricants
New York City Opera (NYCO)
National Youth Choir of Scotland (redirect from NYCoS)
New York City Omnibus Corporation, NYCO routes Fifth and Madison Avenues Line
NYCO (band)